Nebria hellwigii is a species of ground beetle in the Nebriinae subfamily that can be found in Austria, Germany, and  Italy.

Subspecies
Nebria hellwigii chalcicola Franz, 1949
Nebria hellwigii hellwigii Panzer, 1803

References

External links
Nebria hellwigii at Fauna Europaea

hellwigii
Beetles described in 1803
Beetles of Europe